Geoffrey John Smith (born 2 April 1935) is a former English county cricketer.  Smith was a right-handed batsman who bowled right-arm off break.  He was born at Braintree, Essex.

References

External links
Geoff Smith at ESPNcricinfo
Geoff Smith at CricketArchive

1935 births
Living people
People from Braintree, Essex
English cricketers
Essex cricketers
Players cricketers
Marylebone Cricket Club cricketers
Hertfordshire cricketers
A. E. R. Gilligan's XI cricketers
T. N. Pearce's XI cricketers